= Pineapple Smash Crew =

2012 video game

- Developer: Rich Make Game
- Designer: Rich Edwards
- Composer: Syphus
- Engine: Quest3D
- Platform: Microsoft Windows
- Release: February 2, 2012
- Genres: Action-adventure, dungeon crawl
- Mode: Single-player

Pineapple Smash Crew is a 2012 dungeon crawl video game by British developer Rich Edwards. The game Pineapple Smash Crew is a "neo-retro" style, single player, level based, shoot-em-up game. It focuses on smashing and grabbing items, power-ups and strategy. The single player game is currently available for Microsoft Windows.

== Gameplay ==
Pineapple Smash Crew is a 3-D game that gives players a top-down isometric view of the playing field. Using the mouse and keyboard, players control a squad of lost mercenaries fighting through randomized environments to recover the lost coordinates of their mother ship. As players fight the hordes of alien robots and monsters, squad members level up and gain health. The squad itself also levels up and unlocks upgrades, ranging from simple grenades to powerful lasers and mines. Before each mission, players can choose from a selection of ships to board and search. All mission layouts are randomized as are the mission objectives.

As the player advances through the game, the ships become larger and enemies become more challenging. Each level is completed by beating a boss character. The mercenaries move through the game in a tightly bunched formation, each character holding a single grenade, and the players can be rotated to use various types of these grenades. Pineapple Smash Crew is a unique shooting game in that it focuses on grenades as the primary weapon, rather than a gun. There are multiple types of grenades in the game that can be used singularly or in combination, allowing for strategic game play. The primary objective of the game is to blow up everything and obtain as much loot as possible. Secondary objectives and missions are also available. The main purpose of the game is highlighted by the fact that all the visual and audio aspects of the game are purposely pixelated while the explosions occur in very high resolution.

While conducting the mission objective, one of the rooms contains the boss of the level, who is randomly equipped with weapons and defenses. The boss destroys the walls of the room to create a large arena in which players must battle. Aside from the mission objectives, each ship has a computer room that helps players find coordinates for the return trip to the mother ship.

== Audio ==
Soundtrack: The soundtrack consists of frantic, upbeat Chiptune music written by artist Syphus a.k.a. Echo level.

== Reception ==
Pineapple Smash Crew received a score of 62 out of 100 on Metacritic based on 10 reviews.

On IGN, Pineapple Smash Crew received a 5.5 out of 10.
